Neverland is an EP released in 1996 by the musician Tim Skold.

Track listing
"Neverland (Edit)" (3:30)
"Anything (Album Version)" (4:07)
"All Dies" (5:00)
"Neverland (Fuzzy Klub Mix I)" (4:23)
"Neverland (Fuzzy Klub Mix II)" (7:25)
"Anything (Dominatrix Mix)" (5:45)
"Remember (Martin Atkins Doubly Dub Mix)" (5:10)

1996 EPs
RCA Records EPs
Industrial rock EPs
Tim Sköld albums